Carl McCunn (January 25, 1947 – December 18, 1981) was an American wildlife photographer who became stranded in the Alaskan wilderness and eventually died by suicide when he ran out of supplies.

Early life and education
McCunn was the son of Donovan McCunn and Erika Hess. He was born in Munich, Germany, where his father was stationed by the United States Army. He was raised in San Antonio, Texas, graduated from high school in 1964, and enlisted in the United States Navy shortly after dropping out of community college. McCunn served in the Navy for four years and was discharged in 1969. He briefly lived in Seattle, Washington, before settling in Anchorage, Alaska, in 1970.

Alaskan excursion

McCunn had lived five months on the Brooks Range in 1976. McCunn intended to photograph wildlife for about five months. On this trip, he flew in with 500 rolls of film,  of provisions, two rifles, and a shotgun. Believing he would not need them, he prematurely disposed of five boxes of shotgun shells in the river near his camp. He began his stay entranced by the local wildlife, which were returning to their summer grounds.

Although McCunn thought he had arranged for a friend who was a pilot to return for him in August, he apparently had never confirmed this. McCunn had hired an air taxi service to fly him in and was expecting the friend to pick him up as he did not have enough money to pay for air taxi service out; however, McCunn compounded the error by never telling his friend he had hired the air taxi service to fly him to the remote location. The inbound air taxi pilot later testified "we had instructions he was to be picked up by a friend of his before winter set in, with a float plane." As the weather grew colder and his supplies began running low in early August, when the expected plane had not arrived, he wrote in his diary, "I think I should have used more foresight about arranging my departure. I'll soon find out." Apparently McCunn's pilot friend had told McCunn that he might be working in Anchorage at the end of the summer and that McCunn should not count on his help; according to the pilot friend, McCunn had given him money to repair his plane and to fly him into (but not out of) the remote site. McCunn's campsite also was off the regular air traffic route, so he could not count on any planes passing by regularly.

By mid-August, it became obvious to McCunn that his pilot friend was not going to retrieve him. At this point he attempted to make his provisions last longer by shooting local game. He shot ducks and muskrats and tried drying the meat of a caribou he observed die in the lake. The weather stayed warm, above , but it began to rain constantly, with winds blowing from the south. At this point, McCunn's diary indicated his hope that his family or friends would send someone to look for him after he failed to return. He had sent three maps with his campsite marked to some friends and his father, but was not clear about his exact itinerary. Although his father knew he would be in the area, he did not know when McCunn planned on returning. McCunn had also told his father not to be concerned if he did not return at the end of the summer, as he might stay later in the season if things went well. After McCunn was late to return from a prior trip, his concerned father had contacted the police; McCunn had asked his father not to do that again. McCunn's friends testified at the inquest they were not concerned as they believed he had already come out and was working in Paxson.

Sighting

An Alaska State Trooper flew over the lake in late August and observed McCunn's campsite. The pilot did not sense McCunn was in distress, since he waved his orange sleeping bag very casually and, on his third pass of the campsite, he saw McCunn casually walking back to his tent. The State Trooper later testified he saw no reason to surmise McCunn needed any assistance.

McCunn later wrote in his diary: "I recall raising my right hand, shoulder high and shaking my fist on the plane's second pass. It was a little cheer  like when your team scored a touchdown or something. Turns out that's the signal for 'ALL O.K. – DO NOT WAIT!' It's certainly my fault I'm here now! ... Man, I can't believe it. ... I really feel like a klutz! Now I know why nobody's shown up from that incident." Afterward, McCunn discovered a small cache of supplies, including rabbit snares and a few bits of candles, while digging a shallow trench to prepare for winter. He also had to travel for firewood, as he wanted to leave the land surrounding his camp the way he found it.

It is unclear why McCunn did not use it when the weather began getting colder. Eventually snow began falling and the lake froze. Game became increasingly scarce, and McCunn set snares for rabbits, but the traps were frequently raided by wolves and foxes. By November, McCunn had run out of food. A prolonged period of cold weather sapped his energy and motivation, and after developing frostbite in his hands, he lost the dexterity required to set his snares. By Thanksgiving (November 26) he wrote of having dizzy spells and almost constant chills.

Death
Sometime soon afterward, McCunn decided to end his own life. He used all his remaining fuel supplies to create a warm fire. In his diary, he wrote, "Dear God in Heaven, please forgive me my weakness and my sins. Please look over my family." He wrote a letter to his father instructing him how to develop his film. He also requested that all his personal belongings be given to his father by whoever found him. McCunn even suggested that the person who found him take his rifle and shotgun for their trouble. He then pinned his Alaska driver's license to the note and shot himself with his rifle. Just before his suicide he wrote in his diary: "They say it doesn't hurt."

On February 2, 1982, a ski-equipped plane carrying several State Troopers landed at the lake to check McCunn's campsite. They found his tent zipped shut and, upon cutting it open, discovered his corpse, emaciated and frozen, along with his 100-page diary. A coroner's inquest was held in July 1982.

McCunn's father Donovan gave Fairbanks Daily News-Miner reporter Kris Capps access to the diary and two rolls of film. Excerpts from McCunn's diary were published in December 1982 by The San Antonio Light.

See also 
Lillian Alling
Christopher McCandless, subject of Jon Krakauer’s book Into the Wild (1996), later adapted as a 2007 film directed by Sean Penn
Lars Monsen, Norwegian adventurer and TV personality who once travelled on foot and by canoe and dog sled from the east coast of Canada to the west coast. The project took more than two years to complete.
Richard Proenneke, who lived in the Alaskan wilderness for 30 years
Everett Ruess, who disappeared in the Utah wilderness in 1934
Timothy Treadwell
Ed Wardle, who documented his solo wilderness adventure in the 2009 television series Alone in the Wild (2009)

References 
Notes

Sources

1947 births
1981 suicides
20th-century American photographers
Artists from Alaska
Nature photographers
Artists from Anchorage, Alaska
People from San Antonio

American nomads
Suicides by firearm in Alaska